John Mercer Johnson (October 20, 1906 – December 17, 1988) was a justice of the Supreme Court of Arizona from September 16, 1957 to September 20, 1960.

Born in Naco, Arizona Territory, Johnson ran for Pima County Attorney in 1936, losing in the primary election. Two years later, he became the Democratic nominee and won the position. He was reelected three times. Johnson became a Superior Court judge in 1946. He served in that position  until becoming an Arizona Supreme Court Justice in 1957, appointed by Governor Ernest W. McFarland to fill the vacancy caused by the death of the late Justice Arthur T. LaPrade. He stepped down from the Court in 1960 to return to private practice. Johnson became a partner at the firm Johnson, Dowdall & Terry in Tucson. There, Johnson represented Conoco. He died on December 17, 1988.

References

External links
 Photo
 1958 Campaign Photo, The Arizona Post

1906 births
1988 deaths
Justices of the Arizona Supreme Court
Arizona Democrats
People from Cochise County, Arizona
People from Pima County, Arizona
20th-century American judges